Glenn Springs is an unincorporated community and census-designated place (CDP) in Spartanburg County, South Carolina, United States located at a spring. It was first listed as a CDP in the 2020 census with a population of 263.

History
The healing waters of the Glenn Springs were known around the country for over one hundred years. It was said that the waters would heal almost any illness. It is even said that the Indians came to the springs for its healing powers. In the late 18th century, the land around the springs was granted to a Henry Storey by the king. Even George Washington was said to have stopped there to try the waters on a trip to Georgia.

In 1825, John B. Glenn bought the land and opened an inn. The springs took its name from Mr. Glenn. His inn was so popular that in 1835 stock was sold to help build a large hotel on the land. The hotel was known for its elegance and comforts as well as its water. Small cabins and a bottling facility were also built around the inn. The bottles water was even kept in the cloak rooms of many congressmen until the 1940s when the hotel burned. Unfortunately, it was never rebuilt. At one point around the start of the 20th century, there was even a railroad that took patrons from Roebuck, then called Becka, to the inn.

J W Bell owned Glen Springs from the 1930s until 1970. The J W Bell Company in Spartanburg, South Carolina would bottle the spring water in One gallon Glass Bottles and sold it to Drug stores and delivered to homes. It was believed to have many healing properties.

The Glenn Springs Historic District and Williams Place are listed on the National Register of Historic Places.

Education
It is in Spartanburg County School District 6.

Demographics

2020 census

Note: the US Census treats Hispanic/Latino as an ethnic category. This table excludes Latinos from the racial categories and assigns them to a separate category. Hispanics/Latinos can be of any race.

References

External links
Glenn Springs Preservation Society

Census-designated places in South Carolina
Census-designated places in Spartanburg County, South Carolina
Unincorporated communities in South Carolina
Unincorporated communities in Spartanburg County, South Carolina